During the 1995–96 English football season, Watford F.C. competed in the Football League First Division.

Season summary
In Glenn Roeder's third season as manager, Watford struggled and Roeder was sacked in February with the club bottom of the table. Graham Taylor returned to Watford as Director of Football in February 1996, with former player Kenny Jackett as head coach, but was unable to stop the club from sliding into Division Two.

Final league table

Results
Watford's score comes first

Legend

Football League First Division

FA Cup

League Cup

Players

First-team squad

Left club during season

Reserves and academy

References

Notes

Watford F.C. seasons
Watford